Pleckstrin homology domain-containing family M member 1 also known as PLEKHM1 is a protein that in humans is encoded by the PLEKHM1 gene.

Function 

PLEKHM1 may have critical function in vesicular transport in osteoclasts.

PLEKHM1 contains a C-terminal Rubicon Homology (RH) domain, which mediates interaction with small GTPase Rab7. This domain is shared with family RH domain containing family members Rubicon and Pacer, which are autophagy regulators.

Clinical significance 

Mutations in the PLEKHM1 gene are associated with osteopetrosis OPTB6.

References

Further reading